Yves Person was a French Africanist who was Professor at the Sorbonne.

Selected publications 
 A fourth volume of maps published in Paris in 1990. Monumental work of history perhaps unique in African literature.

References

External links 
http://www.webmande.net/bibliotheque/yperson/index.html
http://person.hypotheses.org/

Historians of Africa
French academics